Hasan Şengün (born 14 July 1961) is a Turkish football player and manager who played as a forward.

References

1961 births
Living people
Turkish footballers
Association football forwards
Samsunspor footballers
Trabzonspor footballers
Malatyaspor footballers
Turkey international footballers
Turkish football managers
Samsunspor managers